La Crique is a commune in the Seine-Maritime department in the Normandy region in northern France.

Geography

Population

Places of interest
 A sixteenth-century stone cross at the crossroads.
 The nineteenth-century chapel of Notre-Dame.
 Trinity church dating from the nineteenth century.
 The sixteenth-century church of the Innocents.

See also
Communes of the Seine-Maritime department

References

Communes of Seine-Maritime